Lesignano de' Bagni is a comune (municipality) in the Province of Parma in the Italian region Emilia-Romagna, located about  west of Bologna and about  south of Parma.

Of note in the town is the Romanesque church and monastery comprising the Abbazia di San Basilide in the neighborhood of San Michele Cavana.

Twin towns
Lesignano de' Bagni is twinned with:

  Chaponost, France, since 2008

References

External links
 Official website

Cities and towns in Emilia-Romagna